Rock and Roll Christmas may refer to:
 A Rock and Roll Christmas, a 1995 Christmas rock compilation album
 "Rock and Roll Christmas", a 1983 song by George Thorogood and the Destroyers that appears on the album
 "Another Rock and Roll Christmas", a 1984 Christmas song by Gary Glitter
 Rock 'n' Roll Christmas, a 2011 EP by the Connection